Cook County Board of Commissioners 12th district is a electoral district for the Cook County Board of Commissioners.

The district was established in 1994, when the board transitioned from holding elections in individual districts, as opposed to the previous practice of holding a set of two at-large elections (one for ten seats from the city of Chicago and another for seven seats from suburban Cook County).

Geography

1994 boundaries
When the district was first established, it was located entirely within the city of Chicago, representing parts of the North and Northwest sides of the city.

2001 redistricting
New boundaries were adopted in August 2001, with redistricting taking place following the 2000 United States Census.

The district's new boundaries entirely laid within the city of Chicago. It represented parts of the North and Northwest sides of the city.

2012 redistricting
The district currently, as redistricted in 2012 following the 2010 United States Census, in large part resembled the general geography it had in its previous, 2001, redistricting. It continued to lay entirely within the city of Chicago, representing parts of the city's North Side and Northwest Side.

The district was 19.11 square miles (12,229.79 acres).

Politics
The district has only had Democratic commissioners. Only once has another party run a nominee in an election for the district.

List of commissioners representing the district

Election results

|-
| colspan=16 style="text-align:center;" |Cook County Board of Commissioners 12th district general elections
|-
!Year
!Winning candidate
!Party
!Vote (pct)
!Opponent
!Party
! Vote (pct)
|-
|1994
| |Thaddeus "Ted" Lechowicz
| | Democratic
| | 
|
|
|
|-
|1998
| |Thaddeus "Ted" Lechowicz
| | Democratic
| | 47,588 (100%)
|
|
|
|-
|2002
| |Forrest Claypool
| | Democratic
| |53,457 (100%)
|
|
|
|-
|2006
| |Forrest Claypool
| | Democratic
| |57,709 (100%)
|
|
|
|-
|2010
| |John Fritchey
| | Democratic
| |50,219 (74.72%)
| | William C. "Bill" Miceli
| | Republican
| | 16,987 (25.28%)
|-
|2014
| |John Fritchey
| | Democratic
| |51,499 (100%)
|
|
|
|-
|2018
| |Bridget Degnen
| | Democratic
| |93,561 (100%)
|
|
|
|-
|2022
| |Bridget Dengen
| | Democratic
| |80,278 (81.21%)
| | Xiaoli "Alice" Hu
| | Republican
| | 18,571 (18.78%)

References

Cook County Board of Commissioners districts
Constituencies established in 1994
1994 establishments in Illinois